Dicaelotus is a genus of parasitoid wasps belonging to the family Ichneumonidae.

The species of this genus are found in Europe, Africa and Northern America.

Species:
 Dicaelotus albicinctus Habermehl, 1935 
 Dicaelotus asantesana Rousse, van Noortan Noort & Diller, 2013

References

Ichneumonidae
Ichneumonidae genera